In mathematics, the determinant of a skew-symmetric matrix can always be written as the square of a polynomial in the matrix entries, a polynomial with integer coefficients that only depend on the size of the matrix. The value of this polynomial, when applied to the coefficients of a skew-symmetric matrix, is called the Pfaffian of that matrix. The term Pfaffian was introduced by  who indirectly named them after Johann Friedrich Pfaff.  The Pfaffian (considered as a polynomial) is nonvanishing only for 2n × 2n skew-symmetric matrices, in which case it is a polynomial of degree n.

Explicitly, for a skew-symmetric matrix ,

Cayley obtains this relation by specialising a more general result on matrices which deviate from skew symmetry only in the first row and the first column. The determinant of such a matrix is the product of the Pfaffians of the two matrices obtained by first setting in the original matrix the upper left entry to zero and then copying, respectively, the negative transpose of the first row to the first column and the negative transpose of the first column to the first row. This is proved by induction by expanding the determinant on minors and employing the recursion formula below.

Examples

(3 is odd, so the Pfaffian of B is 0)

The Pfaffian of a 2n × 2n skew-symmetric tridiagonal matrix is given as

(Note that any skew-symmetric matrix can be reduced to this form with all  equal to zero; see Spectral theory of a skew-symmetric matrix.)

Formal definition

Let A = (ai,j) be a 2n × 2n skew-symmetric matrix. The Pfaffian of A is explicitly defined by the formula

where S2n is the symmetric group of order (2n)! and sgn(σ) is the signature of σ.

One can make use of the skew-symmetry of A to avoid summing over all possible permutations. Let Π be the set of all partitions of {1, 2, ..., 2n} into pairs without regard to order. There are (2n)!/(2nn!) = (2n - 1)!! such partitions. An element α ∈ Π can be written as

Let

be the corresponding permutation. Given a partition α as above, define

The Pfaffian of A is then given by

The Pfaffian of a n×n skew-symmetric matrix for n odd is defined to be zero, as the determinant of an odd skew-symmetric matrix is zero, since for a skew-symmetric matrix,

and for n odd, this implies .

Recursive definition

By convention, the Pfaffian of the 0×0 matrix is equal to one.  The Pfaffian of a skew-symmetric 2n×2n matrix A with n>0 can be computed recursively as

where index i can be selected arbitrarily,  is the Heaviside step function, and  denotes the matrix A with both the i-th and j-th rows and columns removed. Note how for the special choice  this reduces to the simpler expression:

Alternative definitions
One can associate to any skew-symmetric 2n×2n matrix A =(aij) a bivector

where {e1, e2, ..., e2n} is the standard basis of R2n. The Pfaffian is then defined by the equation

here ωn denotes the wedge product of n copies of ω.

A non-zero generalisation of the Pfaffian to odd dimensional matrices is given in the work of de Bruijn on multiple integrals involving determinants. In particular for any m x m matrix A, we use the formal definition above but set . For m odd, one can then show that this is equal to the usual Pfaffian of an (m+1) x (m+1) dimensional skew symmetric matrix where we have added an (m+1)th column consisting of m elements 1, an (m+1)th row consisting of m elements -1, and the corner element is zero. The usual properties of Pfaffians, for example the relation to the determinant, then apply to this extended matrix.

Properties and identities

Pfaffians have the following properties, which are similar to those of determinants.
 Multiplication of a row and a column by a constant is equivalent to multiplication of the Pfaffian by the same constant.
 Simultaneous interchange of two different rows and corresponding columns changes the sign of the Pfaffian.
 A multiple of a row and corresponding column added to another row and corresponding column does not change the value of the Pfaffian.
Using these properties, Pfaffians can be computed quickly, akin to the computation of determinants.

Miscellaneous 

For a 2n × 2n skew-symmetric matrix A

For an arbitrary 2n × 2n matrix B,

Substituting in this equation B = Am, one gets for all integer m

Derivative identities 

If A depends on some variable xi, then the gradient of a Pfaffian is given by

and the Hessian of a Pfaffian is given by

Trace identities 

The product of the Pfaffians of skew-symmetric matrices A and B can be represented in the form of an exponential

Suppose A and B are 2n × 2n skew-symmetric matrices, then

and Bn(s1,s2,...,sn) are Bell polynomials.

Block matrices 

For a block-diagonal matrix

For an arbitrary n × n matrix M:

It is often required to compute the pfaffian of a skew-symmetric matrix  with the block structure

When  is invertible, one has

This can be seen from Aitken block-diagonalization formula,

This decomposition involves a congruence transformations that allow to use the pfaffian property .

Similarly, when  is invertible, one has

as can be seen by employing the decomposition

Calculating the Pfaffian numerically 
Suppose A is a 2n × 2n skew-symmetric matrices, then

where  is the second Pauli matrix,  is an identity matrix of dimension n and we took the trace over a matrix logarithm.

This equality is based on the trace identity

and on the observation that .

This procedure merely exploits the property . This can be implemented in Mathematica within a single line:

 Pf[x_] := Module[{n = Dimensions[x] / 2}, I^(n^2) Exp[ 1/2 Total[ Log[Eigenvalues[ Dot[Transpose[KroneckerProduct[PauliMatrix[2], IdentityMatrix[n]]], x] ]]]]] 

However, this algorithm is unstable when the Pfaffian is large. Under the summation, for a real valued Pfaffian, the argument of the exponential will be given in the form  for some integer . When  is very large, rounding errors in computing the resulting sign from the complex phase can lead to a non-zero imaginary component.

For other (more) efficient algorithms see .

Applications
There exist programs for the numerical computation of the Pfaffian on various platforms (Python, Matlab, Mathematica) .
The Pfaffian is an invariant polynomial of a skew-symmetric matrix under a proper orthogonal change of basis.  As such, it is important in the theory of characteristic classes. In particular, it can be used to define the Euler class of a Riemannian manifold which is used in the generalized Gauss–Bonnet theorem.
The number of perfect matchings in a planar graph is given by a Pfaffian, hence is polynomial time computable via the FKT algorithm. This is surprising given that for general graphs, the problem is very difficult (so called #P-complete). This result is used to calculate the number of domino tilings of a rectangle, the partition function of Ising models in physics, or of Markov random fields in machine learning, where the underlying graph is planar. It is also used to derive efficient algorithms for some otherwise seemingly intractable problems, including the efficient simulation of certain types of restricted quantum computation. Read Holographic algorithm for more information.

See also
Determinant
Dimer model
Hafnian
Polyomino
Statistical mechanics

Notes

References
 
  Reprinted in Collected mathematical papers, volume 2.
 
 
 
 
 
 
 
   Online

External links
 
 Pfaffian at PlanetMath.org
 T. Jones,  The Pfaffian and the Wedge Product (a demonstration of the proof of the Pfaffian/determinant relationship)
 R. Kenyon and A. Okounkov, What is ... a dimer?
 
 W. Ledermann "A note on skew-symmetric determinants" https://www.researchgate.net/publication/231827602_A_note_on_skew-symmetric_determinants

Determinants
Multilinear algebra